The sooty chat (Myrmecocichla nigra) is an African songbird of the chat subfamily.

Description
It is 15 to 16 cm (6 to 6.25 inches) long, stocky and relatively short-tailed for a chat.  The adult male's plumage is glossy black except for white patches on the upper wings that are usually visible or only partly concealed (as in the photograph at upper right) when the bird is at rest.  The female and young are very dark brown.

Song
The song (in Kenya and northern Tanzania) is described as "prolonged, sweet and musical, sometimes given in flight, wee tewee tuweer, skwik-skueeeeer, cueee-eeeee-cuweeeeer, eee-euwee-tee, tseuwee-tew-skweeer-tsi-seet…."  This species sometimes imitates other birds.

Range
It occurs widely but discontinuously in African grasslands, from Senegal east to Kenya and south to Angola and Zambia.  Its range is estimated at 3,400,000 km2, and it is considered "frequent" in at least parts of that area.

References

sooty chat
Birds of Sub-Saharan Africa
sooty chat
Taxa named by Louis Jean Pierre Vieillot